Vicente Romero (born 1969) is a Spanish actor from Andalusia. He is primarily recognised for his supporting performances.

Biography 
Born in 1969 in Seville, he was raised in  neighborhood.

He made his television acting debut in 2001 in Hospital Central. Romero's performance as El Maquea in the Benito Zambrano's 2002 miniseries Padre coraje earned him an Actors and Actresses Union Award for Best New Actor in 2003. He landed a role in Jaime Rosales' 2003 film The Hours of the Day, followed by performances in films such as Light Hours, 7 Virgins, and The Night of the Sunflowers. Primarily recognised as a seasoned supporting actor, he is often cast in villain roles.

Filmography

Accolades

References 

People from Seville
21st-century Spanish male actors
Male actors from Andalusia
Spanish male television actors
Spanish male film actors
1969 births
Living people